Pomona State Park, previously called Vassar State Park, is located on the south shore of Pomona Lake, northeast of the community of Vassar in Osage County, Kansas, United States. In addition to a dozen different campgrounds with some 350 modern and primitive campsites and a full-service marina, the park offers facilities for swimming, hiking, and picnicking. It is accessed by K-368, between Vassar, Kansas and nearby Overbrook, Kansas.

See also
 List of Kansas state parks
 List of lakes, reservoirs, and dams in Kansas
 List of rivers of Kansas

References

External links

Protected areas of Osage County, Kansas
State parks of Kansas
1963 establishments in Kansas
Protected areas established in 1963